Tommy Vitolo (born 1978) is an American energy consultant and politician who represents the 15th Norfolk District in the Massachusetts House of Representatives from 2019 to present.

Early life and education
Vitolo grew up in Connecticut and attended high school at the Kent School in Connecticut.  He earned a B.S from North Carolina State University as a Park Scholar, an M.S. from Dublin City University as a Mitchell Scholar, and a Ph.D. in systems engineering from Boston University.

Professional career
Vitolo worked as an energy consultant and expert witness for Synapse Energy Economics, a public interest-oriented consulting firm in Cambridge, Massachusetts. Before joining Synapse, Vitolo worked at the Massachusetts Institute of Technology Lincoln Laboratory.

Personal
Vitolo is married to Jennifer Taranto, has two school-aged children, and lives in Brookline, Massachusetts.

See also
 2019–2020 Massachusetts legislature
 2021–2022 Massachusetts legislature

References

1978 births
Living people
Alumni of Dublin City University
American people of Italian descent
Boston University College of Engineering alumni
Kent School alumni
Democratic Party members of the Massachusetts House of Representatives
North Carolina State University alumni
Politicians from Brookline, Massachusetts
21st-century American politicians